Déjà vu is the sixth album by Blue System. Was published in 1991 by BMG Ariola and produced by Dieter Bohlen. The album contains 10 new tracks.

Track listing

Personnel 

 Dieter Bohlen –  lead vocals, producer, arranger, lyrics
 Rolf Köhler – refrain vocals, chorus falsetto
 Detlef Wiedeke – chorus falsetto
 Michael Scholz – chorus falsetto
 Luis Rodriguez – co-producer, engineering
Recording – in Jeopark by Jeo and Vox Klang Studio
Design – Ariola/Artpool
Photograph – Esser & Strauss, and F. Gabowicz

Charts

External links

1991 albums
Blue System albums
Bertelsmann Music Group albums